The Costa Rican general election of 1853 was held on April 4, 1853. President Juan Rafael Mora Porras was re-elected as the sole candidate, who had been elected in 1849 to end the period of José María Castro Madriz.

According to the historian Ivan Molina from this date and for the next four decades the elections would play a secondary role in the selection of the president limited to a symbolic legitimating function. The presidents were chosen through a series of political alliances between the coffee bourgeoisie and the Army until the beginning of the Liberal State of Costa Rica. On the second-degree election Mora received 83 electoral votes and 8 were null.

References

Elections in Costa Rica
1853 elections in Central America
Single-candidate elections
1853 in Costa Rica